This article refers to Wilhelm G. Solheim II, the anthropologist.  For his father, Wilhelm G. Solheim I the botanist, see Wilhelm Solheim (botanist).

Wilhelm G. Solheim II (1924—2014) was an American anthropologist recognized as the most senior practitioner of archaeology in Southeast Asia, and as a pioneer in the study of Philippine and Southeast Asian prehistoric archaeology.  He is perhaps best known, however, for hypothesizing the existence of the Nusantao Maritime Trading and Communication Network (NMTCN), one of two dominant hypotheses regarding the peopling of the Asia-Pacific region during the Neolithic age.

Life and education 
Wilhelm ‘Bill’ Gerhard Solheim II was born on the 19th of November 1924 in Champaign, Illinois. He entered the University of Wyoming in 1941, with Mathematics as his major and Physics as his minor. In 1943 he joined the US Air Force to train as a meteorologist. He spent his Air Force years stationed in Casablanca, central coastal Africa, and Germany. In 1947, Bill returned to the US to finish his BA degree in Mathematics in 1947. Three months after he finished his undergraduate degree, he pursued a Master of Arts degree in Anthropology at University of California-Berkeley.

Bill once said that his interest in Southeast Asia began in his youth, after having watched the young Indian actor Sabu in the British adventure film “The Elephant Boy” (1937). Entranced by the jungles, the elephants, the cobras, and cave treasures, he viewed that Indian part of Monsoon Asia as indistinguishable from the jungles around Angkor: “Immediately when I saw that I told myself that is where I want to do my archaeology” (p.c., 5/29/2003). Sabu's South Asian lands lay west of the region where Bill would spend his career, but was linked in climate and, in some respects, culture, to mainland Southeast Asia.

With MA in hand, Bill Solheim arrived in the Philippines for the first time on November 30, 1949; Dr. H. Otley Beyer (Doyen of Philippine Anthropology and Archaeology): quickly took Bill under his wing. In Bill's three subsequent years living in the Philippines, he worked in 1950 at Calatagan (Batangas): and in May 1951 in western Masbate (including work at Kalanay Cave site) . Bill took Beyer's classes and got field excavation experience in Luzon. Following advice from Fred Eggan (University of Chicago): Bill began his PhD degree in 1954 at the University of Arizona, and used the Kalanay (Masbate Island, Philippines) assemblage for his doctoral thesis under the advising of Dr. Emil Haury, one of the leading Southwestern archaeologists at the time. While most of his work concentrated in Southeast Asia, Bill also worked on Pacific collections (Gifford's Fijian ceramics at Berkeley, field survey and excavations near Bird's Head, West Papua [1976, 1998]) and gained some North American Paleoindian experience as Haury's PhD student. Bill's doctoral research on collections from the central Philippines developed into a lifelong interest in connections between the Visayas (central Philippines) and the Sa Huynh culture (central Vietnam). Bill completed his PhD at the University of Arizona in 1959, and joined Florida State University in 1960. Bill moved to the University of Hawaiʻi at Mānoa Department of Anthropology in 1961.

Solheim continued with his work as an archaeologist and professor. He advised many graduate students at UHM, worked in a Quonset hut from 1961 to 1970, and then moved to Dean Hall. Solheim's students worked in the Pacific and Asia. Some of his Pacific archaeology PhD's include Paul Rosendahl, Paul Cleghorn. His Southeast Asian archaeology students included Chester Gorman, Karl Hutterer, Donn Bayard, Jean Kennedy, S. Jane Allen, David Welch, and Judy McNeill, all of whom have made significant contributions to the region. He also worked closely with Southeast and South Asian colleagues, and welcome interaction from students and faculty throughout the region.
Solheim's legacy rests as much in his service to his field as it does in his research contributions. While still a doctoral student, Bill began the journal Asian Perspectives in 1957, and served as its editor-in-chief for nearly three decades. Solheim forged important ties with researchers working across Asia, and became close friends with both western and Southeast Asia-based archaeologists in several countries. He was one of only three trained archaeologists that Tom Harrisson ever invited to his Niah Cave excavations, and he stayed three days (Solheim 1977:33). Solheim helped revive the Far Eastern Prehistory Association in 1953, and transformed it into the Indo-Pacific Prehistory Association in 1976 and served as its first President from 1976-1980.

He retired from the University of Hawaiʻi at Mānoa in 1991, and joined the Archaeological Studies Program (University of the Philippines) in 1997.

After his retirement he became Emeritus Professor at the Department of Anthropology, University of Hawaiʻi at Mānoa. Solheim was a Founding Fellow of the Philippine Association for the Advancement of Science, and a Fellow of the American Association for the Advancement of Science.

After the establishment of the Archaeological Studies Program at the University of the Philippines in 1995, Solheim shipped his entire academic book collection to the program. During the mid-1990s, he founded a research station at the site of Ille Rockshelter and Cave in northern Palawan. In 2003, the Solheim Foundation was established to promote archaeology in the Philippines.

Solheim and his wife Dolorlina ‘Nene’ Solheim built their permanent residence in El Nido, near Ille Cave. He remained in the Philippines with his wife until his death. He died on July 25, 2014 at the age of 89.

Works in Southeast Asia 
Solheim began his career in Pacific and Southeast Asian prehistory as a graduate student at Berkeley. His first experience was his study of E.W. Gifford's pottery from Fiji, in which under Gifford's direction, he made a refined classification in preparation for his two-part Master's thesis in Oceanian Pottery published in 1952.

From 1963 to 1966, Solheim directed the Non Nok Tha field program, a joint project of the University of Hawaii and the Fine Arts Department of Thailand, which published two reports in 1968 presenting new information on the Bronze Age in Southeast Asia. 

In 1975, Solheim propositioned a new chronological framework for stages in Southeast Asian culture. The detailed framework consisted of the Lithic Stage, The Lignic Period, the Crystallitic Period, the Extensionistic Period, and the Period of Conflicting Empires. 

One of Solheim's most impactful contributions to Pacific-Asian Archaeology is the establishment of the periodical Asian Perspectives (1957), published by the University of Hawaii Press, of which the first two issues were edited by Beverly H. Solheim, Mary Elizabeth Shutler, and Richard Shutler Jr. The journal became a valuable and well-received source for Southeast Asian and Pacific archaeological studies.

Nusantao Hypothesis 
After several years of research in Southeast Asian prehistory, Solheim presented his Nusantao Hypothesis in 1975, a condensation of his endeavors regarding Austronesian homeland discussions.

Solheim described his hypothesis as “an attempt to present a framework for the cultural history of the Austronesian speaking peoples” and as an alternative to the traditional framework by Robert Heine-Geldern (1932). Solheim's proposition was that “the homeland of the Nusantao is in the islands of the southern Philippines and eastern Indonesia” (Solheim 1975, 112). In his description, according to their position in time and geography, the Nusantao were “boat people”. He believes that most of the pottery found in Southeast Asia and the Pacific can be traced back to Mainland Southeast Asian Hoabinhian origins—from Lapita in Melanesia to the early pottery of Micronesia (2001, 1). Solheim also considers that some pottery from Melanesia and Micronesia originated from Japan (1968). In 2002, Solheim labeled these groups part of his Nusantao Maritime Trade and Communication Network, characterized by their emergence from island and coastal mainland Southeast Asia.

Works in the Philippines 
Solheim's first and real archaeological sojourn on record was in the Philippines. He arrived in the Philippines by boat in 1949 and was met at the Manila piers by H. Otley Beyer, an American anthropologist.

Archaeological Activities 
In 1950, Solheim excavated for a month a jar burial site in San Narciso, Tayabas (now Quezon) in the Bondoc Peninsula.

In 1952, Solheim did an archaeological survey of Fuga Island, one of the Babuyan Islands, where he discovered several burial jar sites. The following year, he excavated a burial jar on Batan Island in Batanes. The excavations resulted in an article summarizing burial jars in Island Southeast Asia (Solheim 1960).

From 1951 to 1953, Solheim conducted surveys and excavations on Masbate Island and was put in charge of a field class in archaeology by Beyer. Several caves and rockshelters were excavated and tested by him, but the most famous of which was the Kalanay Cave site. From one of the sites in Masbate came the first 14C dating in the Philippines. The data generated from these were collated with earlier collected archaeological materials by Carl Guthe resulting in The Archaeology of Central Philippines: A Study Chiefly of the Iron Age and Its Relationships (Solheim 1964).

Solheim led an archaeological exploration of the southeastern coast of Mindanao Island in 1972 with the assistance of Avelino Legaspi of the National Museum and Jaime S. Neri, an archaeology student at the East West Center in Hawaii. This was the first intensive archaeological work in the second largest island in the Philippines. Sites, such as the Talikud Island rockshelter site, were found to contain flaked shells and stone tools.

Periodization of Philippine Prehistory 
In 1980, Solheim suggested an alternative framework for Philippine prehistory based on his wide experience in Philippine and Southeast Asian archaeology. His reconstruction proposes four periods. They are: (1) Archaic Period, from the first arrival of humankind in the country to 5000 BC; (2) The Incipient Filipino, from 5000 BC to 1000 BC; (3) The Formative Filipino, from 1000 BC to 500 AD; and (4) The Established Filipino, from 500 AD to 1521 (with the coming of the Spanish and the beginning of history.

Pottery Training Courses 
In 1982, Solheim, together with Wilfredo P. Ranquillo, codirected the SEAMEO-SPAFA Training Course in Pottery. The course consisted of three phases where the participants underwent formal lectures, hands-on pottery making and immersion in a pottery-making village in Vigan, Ilocos Sur. The hands-on training was led by Solheim's wife, Ludy, who was an expert potter and pottery-making instructor in Hawaii.

Faculty Advisor at the University of the Philippines Archaeological Studies Program 
On August 24, 1995, the Archaeological Studies Program (ASP) was established at the University of the Philippines, Diliman Campus. From 1997, Wilhelm G. Solheim II, along with Professor Alfred Pawlik, was actively involved in the teaching of postgraduate studies of ASP, including archaeological field activities. Both were conferred the rank of Honorary Researcher of the National Museum.

Wilhelm G. Solheim II donated his entire personal library to the ASP. The collection includes several thousand books, journals, bulletins, and other important publications in archaeology spanning over fifty years of research in Philippine, Southeast Asian, and Pacific archaeology and prehistory by Wilhelm Solheim and his contemporaries.

Solheim Foundation 
The Wilhelm G. Solheim II Foundation for Philippine Archaeology, Inc. was established in 2003 by members of the University of the Philippines, the National Museum of the Philippines, and international and independent scholars. Its current president is Alfred F. Pawlik. Working in close collaboration with the Archaeological Studies Program of University of the Philippines, the Foundation's aim is to foster the development of Archaeology in the Philippines.

Selected works 
 Casino, Eric S., George R. Ellis, Wilhelm G. Solheim II, Father Gabriel Casal and Regalado Trota Jose, People and Art of the Philippines, Museum of Cultural History, University of California, Los Angeles, 1962.
 Solheim, Wilhelm G. Archaeology of central Philippines : a study chiefly of the Iron Age and its relationships, Manila : National Science Development Board, National Institute of Science and Technology, 1964.
 Solheim, Wilhelm G. (editor). Anthropology at the Eighth Pacific Science Congress of the Pacific Science Association and the Fourth Far Eastern Pre-history Congress, Quezon City, Philippines, 1953, Honolulu, Social Science Research Institute, University of Hawaii, 1968.
 Solheim, Wilhelm G. Archaeological survey to investigate Southeast Asian prehistoric presence in Ceylon, Colombo : Commissioner of Archaeology, Ceylon Dept. of Archaeology, 1972
 Solheim, Wilhelm G., et al. Archaeological survey in southeastern Mindanao, Manila, Philippines : National Museum of the Philippines ; [Manoa] : University of Hawaii, 1979.
 Solheim, Wilhelm G., et al., (eds). Pacific region 1990 : change and challenge, Washington, D.C. : Fulbright Association ; [Hawaii] : Hawaii Chapter, Fulbright Association, 1991
 Solheim, Wilhelm G. Archaeology of central Philippines : a study chiefly of the Iron Age and its relationships, [Manila] : University of the Philippines, Archaeological Studies Program, 2002.
 Solheim, Wilhelm G., (edited by Victor Paz). Southeast Asian archaeology : Wilhelm G. Solheim II festschrift, Diliman, Quezon City : University of the Philippines Press, 2004. 
 Solheim, Wilhelm G. Archaeology and culture in Southeast Asia : unraveling the Nusantao, (revised edition), Diliman, Quezon City : University of the Philippines Press, 2006.

References

.
.
.

American anthropologists
Historians of the Pacific
University of California, Berkeley alumni
University of Arizona alumni
1924 births
2014 deaths